Vitebsk or Viciebsk is a city in Belarus. It is the administrative center of Vitebsk Region. It has 366,299 inhabitants, making it the country's fourth-largest city. It is served by Vitebsk Vostochny Airport and Vitebsk Air Base.

History

Before 1945

Vitebsk developed from a river harbor where the Vićba River (Віцьба, from which it derives its name) flows into the larger Western Dvina, which is spanned in the city by the Kirov Bridge.

Archaeological research indicates that Baltic tribes had settlements at the mouth of Vitba. In the 9th century, Slavic settlements of the tribal union of the Krivichs replaced them. According to the Chronicle of Michael Brigandine (1760), Princess Olga of Kiev founded Vitebsk (also recorded as Dbesk, Vidbesk, Videbsk, Vitepesk, or Vicibesk) in 974. Other versions give 947 or 914. Academician Boris Rybakov and historian Leonid Alekseyev have come to the conclusion, based on the chronicles, that Princess Olga of Kiev could have established Vitebsk in 947. Leonid Alekseyev suggested that the chroniclers, when transferring the date from the account of the Byzantine era (since the creation of the world) to a new era, obtained the year 947, later mistakenly written in copying manuscripts as 974. An important place on trade route from the Varangians to the Greeks, Vitebsk became by the end of the 12th century a center of trade and commerce, and the center of an independent principality, following Polotsk, and at times, Smolensk and Kiev princes.

The official year of the founding of Vitebsk is 974, based on an anachronistic legend of founding by Olga of Kiev, but the first mention in historical records dates from 1021, when Yaroslav the Wise of Kiev gave it to Bryachislav Izyaslavich, Prince of Polotsk.

In the 12th and 13th centuries Vitebsk functioned as the capital of the Principality of Vitebsk, an appanage principality which thrived at the crossroads of the river routes between the Baltic and Black seas. In 1320 the city was incorporated into the Grand Duchy of Lithuania as dowry of the Princess Maria, the first wife of Grand Duke of Lithuania Algirdas. By 1351 the city had erected a stone Upper and Lower Castle, the prince's palace. In 1410 Vitebsk participated in the Battle of Grunwald. In 1569 it became a part of Polish–Lithuanian Commonwealth. In 1597 the townsfolk of Vitebsk were privileged with Magdeburg rights. However, the rights were taken away in 1623 after the citizens revolted against the imposed Union of Brest and killed Archbishop Josaphat Kuntsevych of Polotsk. The city was almost completely destroyed in 1708, during the Great Northern War. In the First Partition of Poland in 1772, the Russian Empire annexed Vitebsk.

Under the Russian Empire, the historic centre of Vitebsk was rebuilt in the Neoclassical style.

The Battle of Vitebsk was fought west of the city on 26–27 July 1812 as Napoleon attempted to engage decisively with the Russian army. While the French were to occupy the town for over three months (the emperor celebrating his 43rd birthday there) the Russian army was able to slip away with minimal losses towards Smolensk.

Before World War II, Vitebsk had a significant Jewish population: according to Russian census of 1897, out of the total population of 65,900, Jews constituted 34,400 (around 52%).
The most famous of its Jewish natives was the painter Marc Chagall (1887-1985).

In 1919 Vitebsk was proclaimed to be part of the Socialist Soviet Republic of Byelorussia (January to February 1919), but was soon transferred to the Russian Soviet Federative Socialist Republic and later to the short-lived Lithuanian–Byelorussian Soviet Socialist Republic (February to July 1919). In 1924 it was returned to the Byelorussian Soviet Socialist Republic.

During World War II the city came under Nazi German occupation (11 July 1941 – 26 June 1944). During Operation Barbarossa, 22,000 Jews, or 58% of Vitebsk's Jewish population, managed to successfully evacuate to the interior of the Soviet Union, thus saving themselves from the impending Holocaust. Much of the old city was destroyed in the ensuing battles between the Germans and Red Army soldiers. Most of the remaining local Jews perished in the Vitebsk Ghetto massacre of October 1941. The Soviets recaptured the city during the 1944 Vitebsk–Orsha Offensive.

Post-war period

In the first postwar five-year period the city was rebuilt. Its industrial complex covered machinery, light industry, and machine tools.

In 1959 a TV tower was commissioned and started broadcasting the 1st Central Television program.

Independence of Belarus
In January 1991, Vitebsk celebrated the first Marc Chagall Festival. In June 1992, a monument to Chagall was erected on his native Pokrovskaja Street and a memorial inscription was placed on the wall of his house.

Since 1992 Vitebsk has been hosting the annual Slavianski Bazaar, an international music festival. The main participants are artists from Russia, Belarus and Ukraine, with guests from many other countries, both Slavic and non-Slavic. There has been a remarkable improvement and expansion of the city. The central stadium was reconstructed, and the Summer Amphitheatre, the railway station and other historical sites and facilities were restored, and the Ice Sports Palace along with a number of new churches and other public facilities were built, together with the construction of new residential areas.

Attractions

The city has one of the oldest buildings in the country: the Annunciation Church. The building dates back to the period of Kievan Rus. The city at the time was pagan and did not belong to the Ukrainian or Russian Orthodox Church or the Kievan Rus state. It was constructed in the 1140s as a pagan church, rebuilt in the 14th and 17th centuries as a Roman Catholic Church, restored in 1883 and destroyed by the Soviet administration in 1961. The church was in ruins until 1992, when it was restored to its presumed original appearance.

Churches from the Polish-Lithuanian period were likewise destroyed, although the Resurrection Church (1772–77) has been rebuilt. The Orthodox cathedral, dedicated to the Intercession of the Theotokos, was erected in 1760. There are also the town hall (1775); the Russian governor's palace, where Napoleon celebrated his 43rd birthday in 1812; the Neo-Romanesque Roman Catholic cathedral (1884–85); and an obelisk commemorating the centenary of the Russian victory over Napoleon.

Vitebsk is also home to a lattice steel TV tower carrying a horizontal cross on which the antenna mast is guyed. This tower, which is nearly identical to that at Grodno, but a few metres shorter (245 metres in Vitebsk versus 254 metres at Grodno) was completed in 1983. The city is also home to the Marc Chagall Museum and the Vitebsk regional museum.

Geography

Climate
Vitebsk has warm summer humid continental climate, Köppen: Dfb. Summers are generally warm, while winters are relatively cold but still warmer than in Moscow due to a stronger influence of maritime air from the Baltic Sea. Approximately  of precipitation falls here per annum.

Education
The main universities of Vitebsk are Vitebsk State Technological University, Vitebsk State Medical University and Vitebsk State University named in honor of Pyotr Masherov.

Sport
HK Vitebsk of the Belarusian Extraleague is the local pro hockey team.

Linguist
Mikhail Sukernik (1902–1981), contributor to the first Russian-Yiddish dictionary

Notable people

 Leonid Afremov (1955–2020), painter
 Zhores Alferov (1930–2019), physicist, 2000 Nobel Prize Winner for Physics
 S. Ansky (1863–1920), playwright (The Dybbuk)
 Anatol Bahatyroǔ (Anatoly Bogatyrev) (1913–2003), Belarusian composer
 Vladimir Bourmeister (1904–1971), ballet choreographer
 Marc Chagall (1887–1985), artist
 Max Danish (1881–1964), U.S. labor journalist with ILGWU
 Sam Dolgoff (1902–1990), anarcho-syndicalist housepainter
 Tanya Dziahileva (born 1991), model
 Alexandra Holub (born 1986), painter and poet
 Mark Fradkin (1914–1990), composer
 Leon Gaspard (1882–1964), artist
 Joseph Günzburg (1812–1878), Russian financier and philanthropist
 Isser Harel (1912–2003), Israeli intelligence chief
 Lazar Khidekel (1904–1986), artist, architect
 Lev Khidekel (1909–1977), architect
 Franciszek Dionizy Kniaźnin (1750–1807), poet and collector of Belarusian folklore
 Leon Kobrin (1873–1946), playwright
 Marcelo Koc (1918–2006), Argentinian composer
 Sergei Kornilenko (born 1983), footballer
 Lazar Lagin (1903–1979), writer
 El Lissitzky (1890–1941), artist
 Menachem Mendel of Vitebsk (1730?–1788), Hasidic Rebbe
 Anna Missuna (1868–1922), geologist
 Yehuda Pen (1854–1937), artist
 Aliaksei Protas (born 2001), ice hockey player
 Kazimierz Siemienowicz (1600–1651), engineer, pioneer of rocketry
 Ivan Sollertinsky (1902–1944), polymath, critic, and musicologist
 Joseph Solman (1909–2008), American painter
 Simeon Strunsky (1879–1948), author in New York City
 Immanuel Velikovsky (1895–1979), psychiatrist/psychoanalyst and author
 Alexander Vvedensky (1889–1946), one of the leaders of the Living Church movement
 Moshe Wittenburg (1829–1909), financier of land purchases in Israel

Artistic tributes
In 1928, the American composer Aaron Copland composed the piano trio Vitebsk: Study on a Jewish Theme, and the work was premiered in 1929. Based on a Jewish folk song from S. Ansky's play The Dybbuk, Copland's piece is named for Vitebsk Governorate, where Ansky was born, and where he first heard the tune.

Website
The website of the city of Vitebsk www.gorod212.by, a news portal.

Sources
  In Russian. eastview.com
 Любезный мне город Витебск.... Мемуары и документы. Конец XVIII — начало XIX в. / Вступ. ст., науч., коммент., сост., публ. В. А. Шишанова. Мн.: Асобны Дах, 2005. 40 с. 
 Шишанов В. 947 или 914? // Витебский проспект. 2005. No.45. 10 нояб. С.3.
 Изобразительное искусство Витебска 1918 – 1923 гг. в местной периодической печати : библиограф. указ. и тексты публ. / сост. В. А. Шишанов. – Минск : Медисонт, 2010. – 264 с.

Notes

References

External links
 "Vitebsk : The Fight and Destruction of the 3rd Panzer Army" by Otto Heidkamper and Linden Lyons, Casemate Publishers, 2017

External links

 Encyclopedia of Vitebsk
 Cultural space — Vitebsk4.me
 Official web server
 Official site
 Population of Vitebsk by mother tongue in 1897
 The plan of Vitebsk 1904
 Official site of Vitebsk regional museum of local lore
 

 
Shtetls
Cities in Belarus
Populated places in Vitebsk Region
Vitebsky Uyezd
Vitebsk Voivodeship
Polochans
Jewish communities destroyed in the Holocaust